Jonathan C. Knight,  (born 1964, in Lusaka) is a British physicist. He is the Pro Vice-Chancellor (Research) for the University of Bath where he has been Professor in the Department of Physics since 2000, and served as head of department. From 2005 to 2008, he was founding Director of the university's Centre for Photonics and Photonic Materials.

Education
Knight studied at the University of Cape Town where he obtained his B.Sc. (Hons), M.Sc. and PhD. His doctoral thesis was on whispering gallery mode microlasers. He did postdoctoral research at the École Normale Supérieure (Paris, 1994–1995) and at the Optoelectronics Research Centre (University of Southampton, 1995–1996).

Research 
Knight is interested in the behaviour of light in microstructured materials, and in the physics of optical fibres. Working with Russell and Tim Birks, he designed, fabricated and demonstrated a number of novel forms of optical fibre waveguide with previously unobtainable characteristics. This work has led to a range of outcomes including the commercialisation, of a new form of light source (supercontinuum), high power short pulse laser delivery through fibre, and applications in quantum and atomic physics. Belardi and Knight proposed the hollow-core "nested-ring" design for photonic fibres, at the beginning of 2014. Together with William Wadsworth, Knight co-created a new kind of laser capable of pulsed and continuous mid-infrared (IR) emission between 3.1 and 3.2 microns, a spectral range that has long presented a major challenge for laser developers.

Awards and recognition
Elected Fellow of the Royal Society, 2019.
Rank Prize in Optoelectronics Optoelectronics Prize, 2018 
Institute of Physics Optics and Photonics Division Prize, 2012
Fellow of Optical Society of America, 2011
Leverhulme Trust Research Fellowship, 2005–2006

Selected publications

References

External links

Physics at the University of Bath
Prof Knight profile at University of Bath.
Visit to Shanghai Institute of Optics and Fine Mechanics 
Why do we need new types of optical fibres?, in Physics World.
Professor Jonathan Knight on the Special Topic of Photonic Crystals.

1964 births
Living people
British physicists
Academics of the University of Bath
Optical physicists
People from Lusaka
Fellows of the Royal Society
University of Cape Town alumni
Academics of the University of Southampton